HMS Lichfield was a 50-gun fourth rate ship of the line of the Royal Navy, built at King's Yard in Harwich by John Barnard to the dimensions laid down in the 1741 proposals of the 1719 Establishment, and launched on 26 June 1746. She was wrecked on the Barbary Coast of North Africa on 28 November 1758.

Career
Lichfield was built as a replacement to the previous HMS Lichfield which had been broken up in 1744, and used some of the timbers from that vessel. In June 1756, under Captain Matthew Barton, Lichfield captured the French ship of the line Arc-en-Ciel off Louisbourg, Nova Scotia during the Seven Years' War.

In November 1758 Lichfield, was assigned to a squadron under the command of Commodore Augustus Keppel, with orders to transport troops to West Africa to capture the island of Gorée from the French. The ship left Cork Harbour, Ireland on 11 November 1758 along with four larger ships of the line, and six smaller vessels.

Lichfield was assigned to lead the squadron. This proved to be incorrect, as at dawn the following morning Lichfield ran aground on the Barbary Coast.

According to the account of Lieutenant Southerland:

The ship was badly damaged, and broke apart during the day. Around 220 of the 350 crew managed to reach the shore. They were captured and held as slaves for 18 months until ransomed with other Europeans in April 1760.

Citations

Notes

References

Bibliography

Further reading

 

Ships of the line of the Royal Navy
1746 ships
Ships built in Harwich
Maritime incidents in 1758